Kollur Mookambika Temple is located at Kollur in Byndoor Taluk of Udupi District in the region of Tulunadu and in the state of Karnataka, India. It is a Hindu temple dedicated to the Mother Goddess known as Mookambika Devi. Mookambika is the union of Adipara Shakthi and Parabramha as the Linga has integrated on its left side "Maha Kali, Maha Lakshmi and Maha Saraswathi". It is situated in the foothills of Kodachadri hills, on the southern bank of Souparnika River. Being situated in the land between Gokarna and Kanyakumari, believed to be created by sage Parashurama. The main deity of the temple is a swayambhu (self-born) jyotirlinga with a golden line cutting it into half, in which the left half represents Tridevis, and the right half represents Trimurtis. Along with this, a four-handed panchaloha idol of Goddess Mookambika is also installed.

There are sub-shrines for Ganapathi, Shiva, Vishnu, Hanuman, Subrahmanya, Virabhadra and Snake gods in the temple. Rathotsava in the month of Phalguna and Navaratri in the month of Ashwina are the main festivals in this temple. Goddess Mookambika is said to be the name given to Goddess Shakti after she killed the demon Mookasura (also known as Kaumasura). Though the temple is located in Karnataka, most number of devotees coming here are from the neighbouring state of Kerala. It is also one among the most popular shrines visited by Malayalis irrespective of religion and caste.

Legend 
The present deity in form of a devi was established by Adi Shankaracharya. The linga is worshipped as Moola Devi and the representation of devi as a four armed goddess was installed by Adi Shankara. Once, Sage Kola Maharishi was performing Tapas here when he was persistently troubled by a demon. This Demon had also been praying to Lord Shiva to get powers that would make him invincible and let him do whatever he wanted. Knowing the evil mind of this demon, Devi Shakthi made him Mooka (Dumb). So, when Lord Shiva appeared before him, he was unable to ask for any boon. Enraged by this, the Demon began to harass Kola Maharishi, who was also praying to the Lord. Kola Maharishi appealed to the Divine Mother for help. So, Devi Shakthi came down and vanquished the Demon, Mookasura.

Henceforth, in this region, she came to be known as Mookambika. Lord Shiva also appeared before the sage. Maharishi Kola asked that the Lord with His Consort should remain here forever. To grant his wish, a Jyotirlinga appeared, with a Swarnarekha (golden line) in the middle. Thus, one half of this Linga stands for the conscious principle as embodied by Shiva, Vishnu and Brahma, while the other stood for the Creative Principle in the form of Parvati, Lakshmi and Saraswathi.

Goddess Uma appeared here with Lord Shankara and slayed Mukasura. The Goddess Mookambika is in the form of Jyotir-Linga incorporating both Shiva and Shakthi. Thus the temple forms a part in both 108 Shivalayas and 108 Durgalayas of ancient Kerala.

See also
 Mookambika Wildlife Sanctuary
 Marikamba Temple, Sirsi
 Chamundeshwari Temple, Mysore
 Annapurneshwari Temple, Cherukunnu
 Yellamma Temple, Saundatti

References

External links

Official website
Books
Indian Temples Kollur
Mookambika Devi Temple
Sri Mookambika Temple Kollur

Lakshmi temples
108 Shiva Temples
Hindu temples in Udupi district
Devi temples in Karnataka